James Keach (born December 7, 1947) is an American actor and filmmaker. He is the younger brother of actor Stacy Keach Jr. and son of actor Stacy Keach Sr.

Early life and education 
Keach was born in Savannah, Georgia, the son of Mary Cain, an actress, and Walter Stacy Keach Sr., a drama coach, actor, writer, and producer. His brother, Stacy Keach, is an actor and narrator. Keach received his undergraduate degree from Northwestern University, a M.F.A. from the Yale School of Drama, and is also a classically trained Shakespearean actor. He is a patron of Meningitis UK.

Career 
Best known as a producer and director, Keach has also acted, most famously portraying Jesse James in the 1980 film The Long Riders, a film which he co-wrote and produced. Johnny Cash was so taken by the film that he and June Carter became close friends with Keach and asked him to be involved in the development of Walk the Line, which Keach produced. Keach also appeared in numerous supporting roles in films such as National Lampoon's Vacation with Chevy Chase, The Razor's Edge opposite Bill Murray, and Wildcats with Goldie Hawn. He also played a leading role in the 1985 comedy film Moving Violations as Deputy Hank Halik.

He was the director of the 1993 TV series and 1999 film Dr. Quinn, Medicine Woman which starred his wife, Jane Seymour, and other episodic television. Most recently he has directed and produced Waiting for Forever and Blind Dating. He directed a documentary, Glen Campbell: I'll Be Me, about country music singer Glen Campbell and his battle with Alzheimer's disease, that was released in October 2014. He won a Grammy Award on March 14, 2021, as producer for the documentary Linda Ronstadt The Sound of My Voice.

In 2010, James Keach received the Ellis Island Medal of Honor.

Personal life 
Keach was married to Holly Collins, sister of Judy Collins. Their marriage produced a son, Kalen Keach. Sometime after his marriage to Collins ended, he married Mimi Maynard. Their marriage lasted until 1993.

In 1993, Keach married actress Jane Seymour. The couple had twin boys, born November 30, 1995, John Stacy and Kristopher Steven, who were named after family friends Johnny Cash and Christopher Reeve, and James's brother, actor Stacy Keach. On April 12, 2013, it was announced that the couple separated. The divorce was finalized in December 2015.

Filmography

Films

Acting credits

Filmmaking credits

Narrative films

Documentaries

Television films

Acting credits

Filmmaking credits

Television series

Acting credits

Filmmaking credits

References

External links 

Biography1
Biography2

1947 births
American male film actors
American film producers
American male screenwriters
American television directors
Living people
Northwestern University alumni
Yale School of Drama alumni
Golden Globe Award-winning producers
Grammy Award winners
People from Savannah, Georgia
Male actors from Georgia (U.S. state)
20th-century American male actors
21st-century American male actors
American male television actors
Screenwriters from Georgia (U.S. state)
Keach family